Yash Rathod (born 16 May 2000) is an Indian cricketer. In November 2019, he was named in India's squad for the 2019 ACC Emerging Teams Asia Cup in Bangladesh. He made his List A debut for India, against Nepal, in the Emerging Teams Cup on 14 November 2019. He made his Twenty20 debut on 17 January 2021, for Vidarbha in the 2020–21 Syed Mushtaq Ali Trophy.

References

External links
 

2000 births
Living people
Indian cricketers
Place of birth missing (living people)